Michael Austin Cera (born June 7, 1988) is a Canadian actor and musician, known for his awkward, offbeat characters in coming of age comedy films and for portraying George Michael Bluth in the sitcom Arrested Development (2003–2006, 2013, 2018–2019). 

He has had numerous roles in United States television and film productions, including character and for his film roles as Evan in Superbad (2007), Paulie Bleeker in Juno (2007), Scott Pilgrim in Scott Pilgrim vs. the World (2010), and a fictional version of himself in This Is the End (2013). Other starring roles include in Nick & Norah's Infinite Playlist (2008), and Youth in Revolt (2009). Cera also has had dramatic roles in Confessions of a Dangerous Mind (2002), Molly's Game (2017), and Gloria Bell (2019). He voiced Dick Grayson/Robin in The Lego Batman Movie (2017), Barry in Sausage Party (2016), and Sal Viscuso, the voice behind the announcements in Childrens Hospital.

Cera is also known for his Broadway performances in the Kenneth Lonergan plays This Is Our Youth in 2014, Lobby Hero in 2018, for which he received a nomination for the Tony Award for Best Featured Actor in a Play, and The Waverly Gallery in 2019.

In addition to acting, Cera is a musician, having released his debut album True That in 2014. Cera has also performed as the touring bassist for indie rock supergroup Mister Heavenly.

Early life
Cera was born in 1988 in Brampton, Ontario. He is the son of Linda (née Cockman) and Luigi Cera, a technician. His father is Sicilian (Italian), and his mother has Irish, Dutch, Scottish, and English ancestry. His parents both worked for Xerox. Cera has an older sister, Jordan, and a younger sister, Molly. He became interested in acting after viewing Ghostbusters repeatedly when sick with the chicken pox at the age of three. Cera memorized all the dialogue and idolized Bill Murray. He enrolled in The Second City, Toronto, and took improvisation classes.

Cera attended Conestoga Public School, Robert H. Lagerquist Senior Public School, and Heart Lake Secondary School until grade nine. After starting acting, he completed school online through grade 12.

Career

1999–2008: Child acting and breakthrough
His first role was an unpaid appearance in a Tim Hortons summer camp commercial. That appearance eventually landed him a position in a Pillsbury commercial, in which he poked the Pillsbury Doughboy and had his first role with lines.

In 1999, Cera was cast as Larrabe Hicks in the Canadian children's show I Was a Sixth Grade Alien, which ran for two seasons. That year, he also appeared in the television films What Katy Did and Switching Goals, starring the Olsen twins.

The next year Cera made his theatrical film debut in the science fiction film Frequency (2000) as the son of Noah Emmerich's character. Cera also appeared in the films Steal This Movie! and Ultimate G's: Zac's Flying Dream in 2000. He had his first leading role in the latter film, which was presented in IMAX theaters. Cera appeared in several television films in 2001, including My Louisiana Sky and The Familiar Stranger. He also began voicing Josh Spitz in the animated series Braceface, which he continued until 2004.

In 2002, Cera played the young Chuck Barris (played by Sam Rockwell) in the George Clooney-directed film Confessions of a Dangerous Mind. He provided the voice for Brother Bear – an anthropomorphic bear – in the 2003 The Berenstain Bears animated series, which aired for three seasons.

He had a role in the critically panned Fox pilot The Grubbs in 2002, which was never aired. But Cera successfully auditioned for a part in another Fox sitcom, Arrested Development. This began airing in November 2003 and ran for three seasons. The show follows the formerly wealthy and dysfunctional Bluth family, with Cera playing George Michael Bluth, the teenage son of character Michael Bluth, played by Jason Bateman. After three seasons, Fox canceled the series in 2006 due to low viewership, although it had received critical acclaim. In 2006, Cera created and starred in a parody of Impossible is Nothing, a video résumé created by Aleksey Vayner. Cera and his Arrested Development co-star Alia Shawkat guest-starred as a pair of college students in the teen noir drama Veronica Mars, in the episode "The Rapes of Graff" in 2006.

Along with best friend Clark Duke, Cera wrote and starred in a series of short videos released on their website. Duke originated the idea, as he was enrolled at Loyola Marymount University and used their videos for his film school studies. In 2007, the pair signed a deal with CBS Television to write, produce, direct, and act in a short-form comedy series entitled Clark and Michael. The show featured guest stars such as David Cross, Andy Richter and Patton Oswalt, and was distributed via CBS's internet channel, CBS Innertube.

In May 2007, Cera appeared in a staged comedy video that shows him being fired from the lead role of the film Knocked Up, after belittling and arguing with its director Judd Apatow, in a scene that mocks the David O. Russell blow up on the set of I Heart Huckabees. Cera starred in the Apatow-produced teen comedy Superbad alongside Jonah Hill. Their characters in the film – two virgin teenagers about to graduate from high school whose party plans go awry – were based on the comedy's writers Seth Rogen and Evan Goldberg. Superbad was released in cinemas in August 2007, topping the US box office for two weeks in a row.

Cera's performance was critically acclaimed: The Atlantic reviewer said that the film "belongs to Michael Cera" for capturing "teenage sexual abashment as indelibly as he did in the role of George Michael [on Arrested Development]." The New York Times said that he was "excellent" and CNN praised Cera and Hill for playing "off each other beautifully".

In November 2007, Cera hosted a live, staged version of Saturday Night Live; it was not broadcast due to the ongoing 2007 Writers Guild of America Strike. In his second film of 2007, Cera co-starred in Juno as Paulie Bleeker, a teenager who has impregnated his long-time school friend Juno (played by Elliot Page). For Superbad and Juno, Cera won Breakthrough Artist in the Austin Film Critics Association Awards 2007, and was included in Entertainment Weekly's "30 Under 30" list in February 2008.

Cera starred alongside Kat Dennings in the romantic comedy-drama Nick & Norah's Infinite Playlist (2008), in which they played two strangers who bond over their shared love of a band and try to find their secret show. He starred in the comedy Extreme Movie (2008), which was composed of vignettes focusing on teen sex. Cera held a recurring role on the comedy series Childrens Hospital from 2008 to 2016 as Sal Viscuso, a hospital staffer who is known only by his voice through an intercom.

2009–2013: Varied success and stage debut

Cera played a fictionalized version of himself in the independent romantic comedy Paper Heart (2009). It explored the fictional relationship between Cera and the film's writer Charlyne Yi, also playing herself. Cera and Yi composed the film's score together. That year Cera starred opposite Jack Black in the comedy Year One, set during the Stone Age. The film, directed by Harold Ramis, was poorly received, although Time magazine critic Mary Pols said that Cera's performance saved the film from being a "catastrophe". In his final film of 2009, Cera starred in Youth in Revolt, an adaptation of the eponymous novel. He played a shy teenager named Nick Twisp who creates a destructive alter ego, François Dillinger, after becoming smitten with a girl, played by Portia Doubleday.

Cera had also begun to write. His first published short story, "Pinecone", appeared in McSweeney's Quarterly thirtieth issue in 2009.

Cera was cast as Scott Pilgrim in the film adaptation of the graphic novel series by Bryan Lee O'Malley. The film's director Edgar Wright had seen his work in Arrested Development and believed that Cera was an actor "audiences will still follow even when the character is being a bit of an ass". The film, Scott Pilgrim vs. the World, follows Pilgrim, a musician who must battle the seven evil exes of his girlfriend Ramona (played by Mary Elizabeth Winstead). It was released in cinemas in August 2010. It did poorly at the box office, grossing $47.7 million against a production budget of $85–90 million.

Cera made a guest appearance in "The Daughter Also Rises", a 2012 episode of the animated sitcom The Simpsons, as the voice of Nick, a love interest to Lisa Simpson.

Cera made his theater debut in a production of Kenneth Lonergan's play This Is Our Youth in a two-week run during March 2012 at the Sydney Opera House. The play also featured his Scott Pilgrim co-stars Kieran Culkin and Tavi Gevinson. A Broadway production at the Cort Theater opened in September 2014 and closed in January 2015. The New York Times theater critic Ben Brantley praised Cera for achieving "something remarkable": "the sense of an amorphous being assuming and losing shape in the course of roughly 12 hours". Also in 2012, Cera played a supporting role in the drama The End of Love and appeared in the short film The Immigrant.

Arrested Development was revived for a fourth season in 2012 by Netflix, with Cera reprising his role as George Michael Bluth. Cera also worked in the writers' room and served as a consulting producer during its production. The season was released in May 2013.

Cera collaborated with Chilean filmmaker Sebastián Silva on two films in 2013 – Magic Magic and Crystal Fairy & the Magical Cactus – both of which were filmed in Chile and premiered at the 2013 Sundance Film Festival. He spent "five hours a day learning Spanish" for Magic Magic. Cera was featured most prominently in Crystal Fairy, in which he starred as a self-absorbed man travelling Chile with a woman named "Crystal Fairy" (played by Gaby Hoffmann) while bearing a cactus. Along with Reggie Watts, Tim & Eric, and Sarah Silverman, Cera created the web-based comedy YouTube channel Jash in March 2013, where he has posted short films which he directs and/or stars in. These films include the comedy-drama Gregory Go Boom (2013), in which Cera played a paraplegic man, and his directorial debut Brazzaville Teen-Ager (2013), co-starring Charles Grodin as his sick father. He played an exaggerated version of himself in the apocalyptic comedy film This Is the End, which was released in summer of 2013 and featured his Superbad co-stars Jonah Hill and Seth Rogen. Throughout 2013, Cera also appeared on Burning Love, a web spoof of reality dating competition shows, and on an episode of Drunk History as John Endecott. Cera had previously played Alexander Hamilton in a comedic retelling of Hamilton's duel with Aaron Burr on the show's first episode as a web series in 2008 before it was adapted into a television show.

2014–present
Cera appeared with his Arrested Development co-star David Cross' 2014 film Hits, playing a marijuana dealer. He also co-starred alongside John Hawkes and Sally Hawkins in Charlie Kaufman's television pilot How & Why, which was rejected by FX. After a brief, "menacing" appearance in the drama Entertainment (2015), Cera appeared in the prequel to the 2001 comedy film Wet Hot American Summer, the comedy series Wet Hot American Summer: First Day of Camp and in the Christmas musical comedy film A Very Murray Christmas as Bill Murray's fictional talent agent. Cera then voiced a hot dog trying to escape his fate in a supermarket in the animated comedy Sausage Party (2016).

In 2015, Cera made a cameo on Louis C.K.'s Louie on FX, in the season five episode "Sleepover" alongside Glenn Close, John Lithgow, and Matthew Broderick.

Cera had five film releases in 2017, the first of which was the animated superhero comedy The Lego Batman Movie, in which he voiced the Batman's sidekick Robin. He played a supporting role as a sleazy car salesman in the comedy How to Be a Latin Lover and co-starred in Janicza Bravo's first full-length feature, the comedy-drama Lemon. He played an actor described as having a "wedge of hair that makes him look like Frédéric Chopin crossed with Eraserhead", by Variety critic Owen Gleiberman. Cera starred opposite Abbi Jacobson in the drama Person to Person, focusing on the struggles of different people over the course of one day in New York City. Cera and Jacobson are featured as a pair of crime reporters investigating a possible murder. In his final film of the year, Aaron Sorkin's crime drama Molly's Game, Cera played a celebrity known only as Player X who participates in a high-stakes, underground poker empire run by Molly Bloom (played by Jessica Chastain). Cera's fictional character in the film was said to be a composite character of celebrity poker players and actors Leonardo DiCaprio, Tobey Maguire and Ben Affleck.

A "giant fan" of director David Lynch, Cera made a guest appearance in the 2017 revival of Lynch and Mark Frost's television show Twin Peaks in the show's fourth episode, as Wally "Brando" Brennan, the son of Deputy Sheriff Andy Brennan and his wife Lucy Brennan. The appearance contained several references to the work of actor Marlon Brando: Wally shares the same birthday and is nicknamed after Brando.

Cera returned to the stage in March 2018, starring in a second Kenneth Lonergan production, Lobby Hero, at the Helen Hayes Theatre on Broadway. The play also stars Chris Evans, Brian Tyree Henry and Bel Powley. Cera and Henry were both nominated for Best Featured Actor in a Play at the 72nd Tony Awards.

Cera appeared onstage again in October 2018, starring in a third Kenneth Lonergan production, a revival of The Waverly Gallery at the John Golden Theatre on Broadway. The play also starred Elaine May, Lucas Hedges, and Joan Allen.

Cera co-starred in the 2018 film drama Gloria Bell, with Julianne Moore as the title character. Cera's upcoming projects include the animated comedy Paws of Fury: The Legend of Hank about a dog who wishes to become a samurai. Cera returned to his role as George Michael Bluth in the fifth season of Arrested Development in 2018.

In 2021, Cera lent his voice to the adult animated film Cryptozoo.

Music

In 2010, Cera contributed mandolin and backing vocals to the Weezer song "Hang On" from their album Hurley.
Cera has also established himself as the touring bass player in Mister Heavenly, an indie rock band originating in the American northwest, and is a member of the band The Long Goodbye, along with Clark Duke. Cera also played bass and sang back up during songs in both Scott Pilgrim vs. the World and Nick and Norah's Infinite Playlist. He released his full-length debut album True That on August 8, 2014, through his official Bandcamp page. The album features 19 original tracks, a cover of Roderick Falconer's "Play It Again" as well as a cover of Blaze Foley's "Clay Pigeons."

In early 2015, Canadian musician Alden Penner released "Meditate", a track from his upcoming EP Canada in Space, which features Cera. Penner subsequently announced that the EP would be released on June 29, 2015, on City Slang records, as well as a European tour of the UK, Netherlands, France, and Germany, which featured Cera as both co-headliner and member of Penner's backing band. The song "Best I Can" from the film Dina, written and performed by Cera and featuring Sharon Van Etten, was nominated for 'Best Song in a Documentary' at the 2017 Critics' Choice Documentary Awards.

Personal life
Cera has been very private about his personal life. In 2016, Aubrey Plaza made public that the pair had dated for about 18 months after filming Scott Pilgrim vs. the World in 2010 and considered getting married. The two remain friends.

In March 2022, Amy Schumer accidentally revealed that Cera was a father, though the child's name, date of birth, and mother were not disclosed. Later that month he revealed to Extra that the baby was a six-month-old boy.

Filmography

Film

Television

Stage

Discography
Studio albums
 True That (2014)

Soundtrack
 Scott Pilgrim vs. the World: Original Motion Picture Soundtrack (2010)

Bibliography

Awards and nominations

See also
List of former child actors from Canada
Italians in Toronto

References

External links

Michael Cera's Crew Profile on The 1 Second Film

1988 births
20th-century Canadian bass guitarists
20th-century Canadian male actors
20th-century Canadian male musicians
21st-century Canadian bass guitarists
21st-century Canadian male actors
21st-century Canadian male musicians
Canadian Comedy Award winners
Canadian expatriate male actors in the United States
Canadian expatriate musicians in the United States
Canadian male child actors
Canadian male comedians
Canadian male film actors
Canadian male television actors
Canadian male television writers
Canadian male voice actors
Canadian people of Dutch descent
Canadian people of English descent
Canadian people of Irish descent
Canadian people of Italian descent
Canadian people of Scottish descent
Canadian people of Sicilian descent
Canadian television writers
Comedians from Ontario
Living people
Male actors from Ontario
Male bass guitarists
Mister Heavenly members
Musicians from Ontario
People from Brampton
The New Yorker people
Writers from Ontario
The Long Goodbye (band) members